January 5 - Eastern Orthodox liturgical calendar - January 7

All fixed commemorations below are observed on January 19 by Eastern Orthodox Churches on the Old Calendar.

For January 6th, Orthodox Churches on the Old Calendar commemorate the Saints listed on December 24.

Feasts
 The Holy Theophany of Our Lord, God, and Saviour Jesus Christ (Baptism of the Lord) - Cross Procession with Great Blessing of Waters outdoors.
 Traditionally, the beginning of the season of house blessings with Holy Water.

Saints
 Venerable Evagrius, of Nitria (415)
 Venerable-martyr George the Persian (615)

Pre-Schism Western saints
 Martyrs of North-West Africa, burnt at the stake under Septimius Severus (c. 210)
 Virgin-martyr Macra, from Rheims in France, martyred in Fismes in Champagne before the persecution under Diocletian began (287)
 Martyr Anastasius, a martyr in Syrmium in Pannonia, now Hungary (4th century)
 Martyrs Anastasius, Jucundus, Florus, Florianus, Peter, Ratites, Tatia and Tilis, in Syrmium in Pannonia, now Hungary (4th century)
 Saint Hywyn, probably a companion of St Cadfan on his return journey from Brittany to Cornwall and Wales; by tradition he founded Aberdaron in Gwynedd (516)
 Saint Melanius (Melaine), born in Brittany, he was Bishop of Rennes and succeeded in overcoming idolatry in his diocese (c. 535)
 Saint Edeyrn (Eternus), born in Britain, he was hermit and the patron saint of a church in Brittany (6th century)
 Saint Eigrad (Eugrad), a brother of St. Samson, he was a disciple of St Illtyd and founded a church in Anglesey in Wales (6th century)
 Saint Schotin (Scarthin), a disciple of St David in Wales, lived as a hermit on Mt Mairge in Leix (County Laois) for many years (6th century) (see also: January 2)
 Saint Merinus (Mirren of Benchor), a disciple of Dunawd at Bangor in Wales and venerated there and in Brittany (6th century)
 Saint Peter of Canterbury, a monk from St Andrew's in Rome, he was one of the first missionaries sent to England (c. 607)
 Saint Diman (Dimas, Dima), a monk with St Columba and afterwards Bishop of Connor in Ireland (658)
 Venerable Wiltrudis, founded the convent of Bergen near Neuburg in Germany (c. 976) and herself became a nun and the first Abbess (986)
 Saint Frederick of Arras, a monk at St Vanne and later St Vedast Abbey in Arras (1020)

Post-Schism Orthodox saints
 Martyr Assad the tailor (1218)
 New Hieromartyr Romanus, priest of Lacedemonia, at Constantinople, by the sword (1695)
 Saint Theophan the Recluse Bishop of Tambov (1894)
 Saint Laurence of Chernigov Convent, Wonderworker (1950)

New martyrs and confessors
 New Hieromartyr Archpriest Andrew Zimin, his wife Lydia, his mother-in-law Domnica, his two daughters and his servant Maria, of Ussurisk, Siberia (1919)

Other commemorations
 Repose of Schemamonk Nicholas of Valaam (1824)
 Repose of Schemamonk Sergius (Yanovsky) (1876), disciple of St. Herman of Alaska.

Icon gallery

Notes

References

Sources
 January 6/January 19. Orthodox Calendar (PRAVOSLAVIE.RU).
 January 19 / January 6. HOLY TRINITY RUSSIAN ORTHODOX CHURCH (A parish of the Patriarchate of Moscow).
 January 6. OCA - The Lives of the Saints.
 The Autonomous Orthodox Metropolia of Western Europe and the Americas (ROCOR). St. Hilarion Calendar of Saints for the year of our Lord 2004. St. Hilarion Press (Austin, TX). pp. 5–6.
 January 6. Latin Saints of the Orthodox Patriarchate of Rome.
 The Roman Martyrology. Transl. by the Archbishop of Baltimore. Last Edition, According to the Copy Printed at Rome in 1914. Revised Edition, with the Imprimatur of His Eminence Cardinal Gibbons. Baltimore: John Murphy Company, 1916. p. 7.
Greek Sources
 Great Synaxaristes:  6 ΙΑΝΟΥΑΡΙΟΥ. ΜΕΓΑΣ ΣΥΝΑΞΑΡΙΣΤΗΣ.
  Συναξαριστής. 6 Ιανουαρίου. ECCLESIA.GR. (H ΕΚΚΛΗΣΙΑ ΤΗΣ ΕΛΛΑΔΟΣ). 
Russian Sources
  19 января (6 января). Православная Энциклопедия под редакцией Патриарха Московского и всея Руси Кирилла (электронная версия). (Orthodox Encyclopedia - Pravenc.ru).
  6 января (ст.ст.) 19 января 2013 (нов. ст.) . Русская Православная Церковь Отдел внешних церковных связей. (DECR).

January in the Eastern Orthodox calendar